Edward A. Berlin is an American author and musicologist who is most known for his research and written works on the Ragtime artist, Scott Joplin. Berlin has written three books on this topic: King of Ragtime: Scott Joplin and His Era (1994), Reflections and Research on Ragtime (1987), and Ragtime: A Music and Cultural History (1980). He is widely regarded as the leading researcher on Scott Joplin. Beginning in 2005, he annually helps organize the Scott Joplin Memorial Concert at St. Michael's Cemetery in Queens, New York. For the 100th anniversary of Joplin's death in 2017, Berlin established a fund to place an engraved memorial bench next to Joplin's grave.

Early life and education
Edward A. Berlin was born on June 26, 1936, in New York.  Berlin received a Ph.D. in musicology from the City University of New York in 1976.

Awards 
Berlin was awarded the ASCAP-Deems Taylor Award in 1988 for his monograph of Reflections and Research on Ragtime.

Media 

 The Bowery Boys: New York City History, Feb. 23, 2019.
 Fishko Files segment of Weekend Edition, National Public Radio, July 30, 2011.
 Appeared as a fictional character in the novel Joplin's Ghost (2005) by Tananarive Due.
 Four episodes of Jazz on the Air, with Jim Lynch, from 2010 to 2012.

References 

1936 births
Living people
American musicologists
20th-century American male writers
Writers from New York (state)
21st-century American male writers
Scott Joplin
City University of New York alumni
20th-century American biographers